is a railway station in Atsuta-ku, Nagoya, Japan, operated by the private railway operator Nagoya Railroad. It is the nearest station to Atsuta Shrine.

Lines
Jingū-mae Station is served by the following two Meitetsu lines.
Meitetsu Nagoya Main Line
Meitetsu Tokoname Line

Station layout

The station has two island platforms serving four tracks, with the two inner tracks used by the Tokoname Line and the two outer ones for the Nagoya Main Line.

Platforms

Adjacent stations

History
The station opened on 19 March 1917, as a station of the Aichi Electric Railway.

In 1984, a bomb threat was sent to the station, causing it to be closed for two days. Jingū-mae Station lost an estimated $200 USD in revenue.

Surrounding area
Atsuta Shrine
Atsuta ward office
Headquarters of Nippon Sharyo

See also
 List of railway stations in Japan

References

External links

  

Atsuta-ku, Nagoya
Stations of Nagoya Railroad
Railway stations in Aichi Prefecture
Railway stations in Japan opened in 1917
Railway stations in Nagoya